The 2019–20 DFB-Pokal was the 40th season of the annual German football cup competition. 48 teams participated in the competition, including all teams from the previous year's Frauen-Bundesliga and the 2. Frauen-Bundesliga, excluding second teams. The competition began on 3 August 2019 with the first of six rounds and ended on 4 July 2020 with the final at the RheinEnergieStadion in Cologne, a nominally neutral venue, which has hosted the final since 2010. The DFB-Pokal is considered the second-most important club title in German women's football after the Bundesliga championship. The DFB-Pokal is run by the German Football Association (DFB).

The defending champions were Frauen-Bundesliga side VfL Wolfsburg, after they defeated SC Freiburg 1–0 in the previous final. Wolfsburg once again won the cup, defeating SGS Essen after penalties.

The competition was suspended on 16 March 2020 due to the COVID-19 pandemic in Germany, and resumed in June 2020 with matches behind closed doors.

Effects of the COVID-19 pandemic
Due to the COVID-19 pandemic in Germany, on 16 March, it was announced that the competition will be suspended until 19 April. On 3 April, the suspension was extended until 30 April. On 20 May, it was announced that the competition would be continued on 2 June. All remaining matches were played behind closed doors. In addition, five substitutions were permitted for the remaining matches, with a sixth allowed in extra time, following a proposal from FIFA and approval by IFAB to lessen the impact of fixture congestion.

Participating clubs
The following 49 clubs qualified for the competition:

Format
Clubs from lower leagues hosted against clubs from higher leagues until the quarter-finals. If both clubs were below the 2. Bundesliga, there was no host club change.

Schedule
The rounds of the 2019–20 competition were scheduled as follows:

Matches
A total of forty-nine matches will take place, starting with the first round on 3 August 2019 and culminating with the final on 4 July 2020 at the RheinEnergieStadion in Cologne.

Times up to 26 October 2019 and from 29 March 2020 are CEST (UTC+2). Times from 27 October 2019 to 28 March 2020 are CET (UTC+1).

First round
The seventeen matches were drawn on 11 July and took place on 3 and 4 August 2019. The twelve clubs from the 2018–19 Bundesliga season and the three best-placed clubs from the 2018–19 2. Bundesliga received a bye.

|}

Second round
The draw was held on 10 August 2019. The matches will be played on 7 and 8 September 2019.

|}

Round of 16
The draw was held on 13 September 2019. The matches were played on 16 and 17 November 2019.

|}

Quarterfinals
The draw was held on 9 February 2020. The matches were played on 2 and 3 June 2020 behind closed doors, due to the COVID-19 pandemic in Germany.

|}

Semifinals
The draw was held on 26 May 2020. The matches took place on 10 and 11 June 2020 behind closed doors.

|}

Final

Notes

References

Women
2019–20
DFB-Pokal Frauen, 2019–2020